Ingo Schäfer (born 20 October 1965) is a German politician for the SPD, trade unionist, and since 2021 the member of the Bundestag, the federal parliament.

Life and politics 

Schäfer was born 1965 in the West German town of Solingen. In his youth he worked alongside his father, who was himself a member of the SPD. and was elected directly to the Bundestag in 2021.

References 

Living people
1965 births
People from Solingen
Social Democratic Party of Germany politicians
Members of the Bundestag 2021–2025
21st-century German politicians